Allepipona perspicax is a species of wasp in the Vespidae family. It was described by Giordani Soika in 1987.

References

Potter wasps
Insects described in 1987